Peep Peterson (born 29 March 1975) is an Estonian politician. He serves as Minister of Health and Labour in the second cabinet of Prime Minister Kaja Kallas.

References 

Living people
1975 births
Politicians from Tartu
Government ministers of Estonia
Social Democratic Party (Estonia) politicians
21st-century Estonian politicians
University of Tartu alumni